Andy Roddick was the defending champion but lost in the third round to Fernando Meligeni.

James Blake won in the final 1–6, 7–6(7–5), 6–4 against Paradorn Srichaphan.

Seeds
The top eight seeds received a bye to the second round.

Draw

Finals

Top half

Section 1

Section 2

Bottom half

Section 3

Section 4

External links
 2002 Legg Mason Tennis Classic draw

2002 ATP Tour